The 1932 season was the third completed season of Finnish Football League Championship, known as the Mestaruussarja.

Overview

The 1932 Mestaruussarja  was contested by 8 teams, with HPS Helsinki winning the championship which was also known as the A-sarja [‘A-series’]. Toverit Helsinki and KIF Helsinki were relegated to the second tier which was known as the B-sarja [‘B-series’].

Participating clubs 

In 1932, there were 8 participants in the Mestaruussarja:

 HIFK Helsinki
 HPS Helsinki 
 KIF Helsinki 
 Toverit Helsinki — Promoted from B-sarja
 Sudet Viipuri 
 VPS Vaasa   
 TPS Turku 
 ÅIFK Turku — Promoted from B-sarja

League table

Results

References

Mestaruussarja seasons
Fin
Fin
1932 in Finnish football